Adolf Eugen Fick (3 September 1829 – 21 August 1901) was a German-born physician and physiologist.

Early life and education
Fick began his work in the formal study of mathematics and physics before realising an aptitude for medicine. He then earned his doctorate in medicine from the University of Marburg in 1851. As a fresh medical graduate, he began his work as a prosector. He died in Flanders at age 71.

Career
In 1855, he introduced Fick's laws of diffusion, which govern the diffusion of a gas across a fluid membrane. In 1870, he was the first to measure cardiac output, using what is now called the Fick principle.

Fick managed to double-publish his law of diffusion, as it applied equally to physiology and physics. His work led to the development of the direct Fick method for measuring cardiac output.

Anecdotal
Fick's nephew, Adolf Gaston Eugen Fick, invented the contact lens.

References

External links
 Short biography and bibliography in the Virtual Laboratory of the Max Planck Institute for the History of Science
 Science Quotes by Adolf Eugen Fick (todayinsci.com)

1829 births
1901 deaths
Alldeutscher Verband members
German biophysicists
German physiologists
Physicians from Kassel
People from the Landgraviate of Hesse-Kassel
University of Marburg alumni
Academic staff of the University of Würzburg
Academic staff of the University of Zurich